Finger Wigglers is an album by bassist Michael Bisio and multi-instrumentalist and composer Joe McPhee recorded in 1996 and first released on the CIMP label.

Reception

Allmusic reviewer Scott Yanow states "This set will not convert listeners strictly into straight-ahead jazz, but it is a fine all-round outing for McPhee and the supportive bassist Bisio".

Track listing 
All compositions by Joe McPhee except as indicated
 "Lonely Woman" (Ornette Coleman) - 11:00
 "Blue Monk" (Thelonious Monk) - 6:53
 "Here's That Rainy Day" (Jimmy Van Heusen, Johnny Burke) - 8:38
 "Running Out of Time" - 4:17
 "Malachi" - 5:46
 "Going Home" (Traditional) - 6:20
 "Walking Out" (Michael Bisio) - 8:44
 "Lonely Woman" [Take 2] (Coleman) - 8:34

Personnel 
Joe McPhee - tenor saxophone
Michael Bisio - bass

References 

Joe McPhee albums
Michael Bisio albums
1997 albums
CIMP albums